or  is a lake that lies in the municipality of Grane in Nordland county, Norway. It lies about halfway between the villages of Trofors and Majavatn. The European route E6 highway runs along the eastern side of the lake.

See also
 List of lakes in Norway
 Geography of Norway

References

Lakes of Nordland
Grane, Nordland